Paraplagusia is a genus of tonguefish. It is indigenous to the Indo-Pacific region, where commonly found in shallow waters on a muddy or sandy bottom. The largest species reaches  in length.

Species
The currently recognized species in this genus are:
 Paraplagusia bilineata (Bloch, 1787) (doublelined tongue sole)
 Paraplagusia bleekeri Kottelat, 2013 (Bloch's tongue sole)

 Paraplagusia guttata (W. J. Macleay, 1878)
 Paraplagusia japonica (Temminck & Schlegel, 1846) (black cow-tongue)
 Paraplagusia longirostris Chapleau, Renaud & Kailola, 1991 (long-snouted tongue sole)
 Paraplagusia sinerama Chapleau & Renaud, 1993 (dusky tongue sole)

References

Cynoglossidae
Marine fish genera
Taxa named by Pieter Bleeker